Sacré-Cœur-de-Marie-Partie-Sud was a former parish municipality in L'Amiante Regional County Municipality in the Chaudière-Appalaches region of Quebec.

It ceased to exist on February 14, 2001, when it merged with Saint-Méthode-de-Frontenac to form the new municipality of Adstock, Quebec.

References

Former municipalities in Quebec
Populated places disestablished in 2001